Sons of Funk is an American R&B group and production group from Richmond, California, United States, that were formerly artists on No Limit Records. They had great success in the late 1990s and are best known for their hit singles "Pushin Inside You" and "I Got the Hook Up!".

Music career

1997-98: The Game of Funk

By 1997, Sons of Funk was signed to No Limit Records by  Master P, who had ties to Richmond, California. Their first mainstream appearance was on the soundtrack to I'm Bout It on the single Pushin' Inside You, which was also produced by the group. The single made it to number 97 on the Billboard Hot 100.

On April 21, 1998 Sons of Funk would release their debut album The Game of Funk on No Limit Records & Priority Records. The album would chart at #44 on the Billboard 200. 

Sons of Funk appeared and produced the song "End Of The Road" on Silkk The Shocker's January 1999 album Made Man. In late 1999 the group would retire from the music industry due to unknown reasons.

2014-present: Reunion & The Lost Files, Vol. 1
In 2014 the group would reunite, on January 8, 2015 they would release their second album together entitled The Lost Files, Vol. 1 via S.O.F. Music LLC, Sons of Funk also has new music video for the first single from the album entitled "Inside of You".

2016- The Lost Files, Vol. 2

Record production
The group also produced songs on Silkk the Shocker's Made Man and Mo B. Dick's Gangsta Harmony.

Members
Zo
Dez Dynamic, Jerry JP Perkins, Rico Crowder

Discography

Studio albums

Soundtrack albums

Singles

As lead artist

As featured artist

See also
 No Limit Records
 No Limit Records discography
 Beats by the Pound

References

American hip hop groups
American rhythm and blues musical groups
Southern hip hop groups
No Limit Records artists